Chalandray is a commune in the Vienne department in the Nouvelle-Aquitaine region in western France.

The Prime Meridian passes through Chalandray. This is shown by a sign marking the 'Méridien de Greenwich'.

See also
Communes of the Vienne department

References

Communes of Vienne